President's Trophy is a Finnish ice hockey award given by the Honorary Chairman of the Finnish Ice Hockey Association, Kai Hietaranta, to a person who has made an impressive impact on hockey in Finland.

Winners 
 1993-94 Jari Kurri
 1994-95 Timo Jutila
 1995-96 Hannu Virta
 1996-97 Jarmo Myllys
 1997-98 Teemu Selänne
 1998-99 Saku Koivu
 1999-00 Esa Tikkanen
 2000-01 Raimo Helminen
 2001-02 Janne Ojanen
 2002-03 (not awarded)
 2003-04 Päivi Virta (previously Halonen)
 2004-05 Ville Peltonen
 2005-06 Erkka Westerlund
 2006-07 (not awarded)
 2007-08 (not awarded)
 2008-09 Sami Kapanen
 2009-10 Janne Ojanen
 2010-11 Mikael Granlund
 2011-12 Mikko Koivu
 2012-13 Antti Raanta
 2013-14 Teuvo Teräväinen
 2014-15 Ville Nieminen
 2015-16 Jesse Puljujärvi
 2016-17 Patrik Laine
 2017-18 Riikka Sallinen
 2018-19 Kaapo Kakko
 2019-20 (not awarded)
 2020-21 (not awarded)
 2021-22 Valtteri Filppula

References

Liiga trophies and awards